Chahar Rah (also Romanized as Chahār Rāh) is a village in Hezarmasjed Rural District, in the Central District of Kalat County, Razavi Khorasan Province, Iran. At the 2006 census, its population was 52, in 15 families.

References 

Populated places in Kalat County